Vasile Drăguț (January 9, 1928—November 1, 1987) was a Romanian art critic and academic.

Born in Murgași, Dolj County, he graduated from Saint Sava National College in Bucharest. A professor at the Fine Arts Institute in that city, he was also editor-in-chief of Arta magazine. A prominent researcher of Romanian art, particularly from the medieval period, he published some thirty books, along with numerous articles and studies. He was buried at Râmeț Monastery.

Selected bibliography
Stilurile Greciei Antice (1962)
Nicolae Dărăscu (1966)
Sighișoara (1966)
Vechi monumente hunedorene (1968)
Arta brâncovenească (1971)
Arta gotică în România (1979)
Cetatea Sighișoara (1968)
Arta românească : preistorie, antichitate, ev mediu, renaștere (1982)
Fata morgană la Tassili (1983)
Dicționar enciclopedic de artă medievală românească (1976)
Medalioane în cerneală (1988)

Notes

1928 births
1987 deaths
People from Dolj County
Saint Sava National College alumni
Academic staff of the Bucharest National University of Arts
Romanian art historians
Romanian magazine editors
20th-century Romanian historians